The Botswana Agricultural Marketing Board Workers' Union (BAMBWU) is a trade union affiliate of the Botswana Federation of Trade Unions in Botswana.

References

Botswana Federation of Trade Unions
Agriculture in Botswana
Organisations based in Gaborone
Trade unions in Botswana
Agriculture and forestry trade unions